The 1985 Prague Skate was held in November in Prague, Czechoslovakia. Medals were awarded in the disciplines of men's singles, ladies' singles and pair skating. The competitions consisted only of a short program (Friday, 8 November) and free program (Saturday, 9 November). The exhibitions took place on Sunday, 10 November.

Men

Ladies

Pairs

References

Prague Skate
Prague Skate